Suela Mëhilli (born January 28, 1994 in Vlorë, Albania) is an alpine skier from Albania. She competed for Albania at the 2014 Winter Olympics in the giant slalom competition. She was the first female athlete to represent the country at the Winter Olympics.

In 2018 Mehilli and Erjon Tola represented Albania at the Winter Olympic Games in South Korea. It was his fourth and her second Olympics.

See also
Albania at the 2014 Winter Olympics

References

External links
 

1994 births
Living people
Albanian female alpine skiers
Sportspeople from Vlorë
Olympic alpine skiers of Albania
Alpine skiers at the 2014 Winter Olympics
Alpine skiers at the 2018 Winter Olympics